American Samoa Department of Education (ASDOE) operates public schools in American Samoa, an insular area of the United States. The public primary schools of the Eastern District includes the following: Matafao Elementary, Aua Elementary, Pago Elementary, Masefau Elementary, etc. The public primary schools of the Western District includes the following: Alataua Elementary, Leone Midkiff Elementary, Pavaiai Elementary, Lupelele Elementary, Manulele Tausala Elementary, and Tafuna Elementary. On the secondary level, these schools are the 5 largest high schools in time order: Samoana High School (1946), Leone High School (1965), Fagaitua High School (1968), Nu’uli Vo-Tech High School (1982), and Tafuna High School (1982). Samoana High School is the first secondary school of the territory, and at the time it was simply called American Samoa High School. However, when other new high schools were established, it was renamed Samoana. Samoana High today is the second largest high school in terms of student population (946) and the third largest high school in terms of area (295,000 sq. Ft.). Leone High School is the first Western District High School. Faced with a shrinking student population, Leone High today ranks 3rd in terms of student population (675) and is the second largest high school in terms of area (353,000 sq. Ft.). Fagaitua High School is the first Eastern District High School. It is the 4th largest high school in terms of student enrollment (537) and the 4th largest high school in terms of area (117,000 sq. Ft.). Nu’uli Vo-Tech High School is the first trade-school in the territory. Because of this, it has the smallest student enrollment (265). It is also the smallest out of the big 5 in terms of area (100,000 sq. Ft.). Tafuna High School is the newest public high school in the territory. It has grown to have the largest student enrollment (1202) and boast the largest school size (527,000 sq. Ft.) Each high school, except Nu’uli Vo-Tech, are given unique nicknames entitled to their specific color/ reputation: Samoana Sharks “Blue Empire”, Leone Lions “Lion Kingdom”, Fagaitua Vikings “Funky Town”, and Tafuna Warriors “Warrior Nation.”

Schools

Colleges
 American Samoa Community College

Secondary schools
 Fagaitua High School 
 Leone High School
 Manu'a High School
 Nu'uli Polytechnic High School 
 Samoana High School
 Tafuna High School
 Kanana Fou High School

Primary schools
 A.P. Lutali (Aunu'u) Elementary School
 Afono Elementary School
 Alatua Lua Elementary School
 Alofau Elementary School
 Aua Elementary School
 Fagasa Le'atele Elementary School
 Faleaso Elementary School
 Fitiuta Elementary School
 Lauli'i Elementary School
 Leone Midkiff Elementary School
 Lupelele Elementary School
 Manulele Elementary School
 Manulele Junior High School
 Masefau Elementary School
 Matafao Elementary School
 Matatula Elementary School
 Mt. Alava Elementary School
 Olomoana Elementary School
 Olosega Elementary School
 Pava'ia'i Elementary School
 Siliga Elementary School
 Taputapu Elementary School
 Uifa'atali Peter Coleman Elementary School (Pago Pago)

External links
 American Samoa Department of Education

State departments of education of the United States
Education in American Samoa
School districts in the United States
Education
Organizations based in American Samoa